Eurycoma longifolia, also known as tongkat ali, akar ali, pasak bumi, or longjack, is a flowering plant in the family Simaroubaceae with a wide range of uses and potential health benefits.

It is native mainly to Malaysia and Indonesia, but also found in Myanmar, Thailand, Vietnam and the Philippines.

The plant is a medium-sized slender shrub that can reach  in height. The root of the plant has been used in folk medicine of the South East Asian region, and in modern times has common use as dietary supplements, as well as food and drink additives.

Names

Older literature, such as a 1953 article in the Journal of Ecology, may cite only penawar pahit as the plant's common Malay name.

Eurycomalongifolia is now known by commercial household names such as "tongkat ali", "akar ali" and "pasak bumi", and most of it refers to the Yellow Tongkat Ali. The Yellow Tongkat Ali has distinctive yellowish tone on its bark and root and it is the most widely researched by scientists with more than 150 - 300 studies published to date.

On the other hand, Black Tongkat Ali refers to different species known as Polyalthia bullata with a small root at 2–3 cm in diameter, which is a significantly smaller diameter than yellow Tongkat Ali. Black Tongkat Ali is also known as Wild Black Gorilla, Tongkat Ali Baginda and Tongkat Ali Hitam, commonly found along the rivers in the lowland forest of Peninsular Malaysia such as in the state of Pahang

Indonesia and Malaysia also has a red-coloured variety known as "tongkat ali/pasak bumi merah" ("merah" meaning "red"), which is being studied by researchers.  Red Tongkat Ali is believed to originate from a species known as Stema Tuberosa, although some scientists may classify it as Jackiopsis Ornate from the family of Rubaceae.

Eurycoma longifolia is also known by the species name Eurycoma longifolia Jack, as this was the name used by botanist William Jack in his taxonomical description published in 1822.

Description
A medium size slender shrub reaching , often unbranched with reddish brown petioles. Leaves compound, even pinnate reaching  meter in length. Each compound leaf consists of 30 to 40 leaflets, lanceolate to obovate-lanceolate.

Inflorecense axillary, in large brownish red panicle, very pubescent with very fine, soft, granular trichomes. Flowers are dioecious. Petals are small, very fine pubescent. Drupe hard, ovoid, yellowish brown when young and brownish red when ripe. The plant grows in the understorey of lowland forests, and survives on a variety of soils but prefers acidic, well-drained soil.

It takes 3 to 5 years to reach its maturity before it can be harvested. Mature roots contain higher bioactive ingredients depending on the soil quality and conditions.

Uses
The plant is used in the traditional medicine of Indonesia, Malaysia and Vietnam. In Indonesia and Malaysia, the root of the plant is boiled in water, and the water is consumed as a health tonic for post-partum recovery, as an aphrodisiac, as well as the relief of fever, intestinal worms, dysentery, diarrhea, indigestion, and jaundice.

In Vietnam, the flower and fruits are used to treat dysentery, and the root is used for malaria and fever. In Malaysia, a paste of the plant is applied topically to relieve headaches and stomach-aches.  There is a traditional belief that E.longifolia is an aphrodisiac. Other health benefits attributed to this plant include antimalarial, antidiabetic, antimicrobial, antipyretic, anti-dengue  and immunomodulation activities.

In Indonesia and Malaysia, E.longifolia has been widely commercialized. Its root, which is highly bitter, has been used as the basis for supplements, as well as food and drink additives.

In the US, the extract has self-affirmed generally recognized as safe (GRAS) status, as an ingredient. As a supplement, it has been marketed for the supposed benefits of sexual health improvement, testosterone booster, as an energy and stamina booster, for improving blood circulation, to reduce stress, and fat reduction. In the drinks market, it is a common ingredient for coffee and beverages marketed as energy drinks.

Potential Benefits 
There are at least 12 potential health benefits of Tongkat Ali (Eurycoma longifolia) from a collection of 300 research studies and clinical trials since the late 90s. The most widely researched bioactive ingredients from Tongkat Ali is eurycomanone. There is growing clinical data in recent years to support the use of Eurycoma longifolia as a supplement with increasing results to validate its potential benefits.

Testosterone 
In 2014, a study published in Andrologia on 76 patients diagnosed with Late-Onset Hypogonadism (LOH) reported improvements in serum testosterone levels after supplementation of Eurycoma Longifolia.

In 2021, a randomised, double-blind, placebo-controlled clinical study on a group of 105 male between 50 to 70 years of age showed significant improvement in total testosterone, free testosterone and dihydroepiandrosterone (DHEA) levels after 5 weeks.

In 2021, a peer-reviewed study published by the Journal of Andrology conducted by the University of Malaya and Liverpool John Moores University  reported that E. longifolia led to increased testosterone in young men between 24 to 30 years of age. The study involving 32 male participants suggested that the raised testosterone level may be due to a greater rate of hormone production via the hypothalamic-pituitary-adrenal axis and the supplementation of Eurycoma longifolia for two weeks demonstrates steroidogenic effects on young men were dose-related.

A separate study published in 2021 involving 45 middle-aged male participants conducted by Santa Catarina State University in Brazil found that, over a 6 month period, E. longifolia caused increased muscle strength and testosterone levels.

Men's Libido & Fertility 
In 2012, a randomized, double-blind study of 109 male participants showed significant improvements in libido, sexual performance, satisfaction, physical performance, sperm volume and sperm motility after supplementation.

In 2014, a randomized, double-blind study placebo-controlled study on 26 male participants between 40–65 years showed improvements in sexual intercourse performance, erectile hardness, sexual mood after supplementation for 12 weeks.

Stress & Mood Profile 
A placebo-controlled study involving 63 test participants (32 men and 31 women) showed a reduction tension, anger, and confusion after the supplementation of Tongkat Ali (Eurycoma Longifolia). The same study published in the Journal International of Sports Nutrition reported reduction in cortisol (i.e stress hormones) after consuming Tongkat Ali which led to improvement in the overall mood profile.

Another study showed Tongkat Ali (Eurycoma Longifolia) had positive effects on Brain Cortical and Hippocampal Dopamine, which may contribute strongly to a better mood and cognition abilities.

Immune System 
In 2014, a randomized double-blind placebo-controlled clinical trial conducted by group of scientists at Institute for Health and Life Science Co., Ltd. Japan showed higher CD4+ T-cells, Lymphocytes, Naive T-cells, and other T-cells on 83 males participants who consumed Tongkat Ali (Eurycoma Longifolia) for four weeks.

Anti-Inflammatory, Anti-Bacteria, Anti-Ulcer and Anti-Parasitic 
A 2021 placebo-controlled clinical study on 103 men between 50–70 years showed a reduction of uric acid from 5.69 mg / dL to 5.03 mg / dL after supplementation of Tongkat Ali for 12 weeks. This study suggests the potential use of Tongkat Ali to prevent the risk of gout and flares by reducing level of uric acid in the body.

A peer-reviewed study in 2019 by a group of researchers from the Kangwon National University in Korea and Hanoi University of Pharmacy found that Tongkat Ali contains anti-inflammatory properties. The outcome of the study was published on the Vietnam Government's website.

In a study by Taif University published in the Saudi Medical Journal, Eurycoma Longifolia inhibited the growth of harmful bacteria (which includes Salmonella, staph, typhoid-causing bacteria E and. coli,), indicating the anti-bacterial properties of Tongkat Ali.

Scientists from the Shionogi Research Laboratories in Japan found evidence that the quassinoids (eurycomanone) in Tongkat Ali may prevent the formation of ulcers by decreasing the surplus amount of acid in the stomach. The study was published in the European Journal of Medicinal Chemistry in 2004.

Anti-COVID19 
An in vitro study published by the American Chemical Society and American Society of Pharmacognosy in 2022 suggests that quassinoids in Tongkat Ali (Eurycoma Longifolia) contain anti-coronavirus properties, which may serve as potential treatment candidates for COVID-19. Other similar studies also suggest Tongkat Ali as a potential herbal remedy to manage COVID-19 symptoms.

Anti-Cancer Properties 
Tongkat Ali (Eurycoma Longifolia) has shown anticancer activities on various types of cancer, including lung, breast, cervical, colon and rectum cancers. More in-vitro and in-vivo studies are currently being conducted to validate its anti-cancer properties in recent years.

An in-vitro study on Tongkat Ali (Eurycoma Longifolia) showed antiproliferative and cytotoxic activity towards human breast cancer cell line (MCF-7) without affecting normal breast cells (MCF-10A).

A 2021 study published a group of scientists from the Hospital of Hangzhou Medical College China showed that DHOK (14,15β-dihydroxyklaineanone), a novel diterpene isolated from roots of Tongkat Ali (Eurycoma longifolia), has anti-cancer properties against Colorectal cancer (CRC).

A similar mode of action was also noticed by a study which reported that eurycomanone in Tongkat Ali showed anticancer activity against cervical cancer, i.e carcinoma HeLa cells. Eurycomanone was found to trigger apoptosis by promoting the up-regulation of p53 tumor suppressor protein which was followed by the increasing of pro-apoptotic Bax protein and the decreasing of anti-apoptotic Bcl-2.

Commercialization

Research and Development. 
The initial commercialization of Tongkat Ali extract was spearheaded by a group of scientists from The Massachusetts Institute of Technology (MIT) and the Forest Research Institute of Malaysia (FRIM) in 2003.

The MIT-formulated Tongkat Ali using hot water extraction and standardized extract protocol formed the underlying foundation in the development of a Tongkat Ali standards known as the Malaysian Standard MS2409 which was published in 2011.

The research and development of E. longifolia or Tongkat Ali extract is still on going with increasing number of clinical trials on men and women to validate its pharmacological benefits to health. According to the American Botanical Council (also known as Herbal Medicine Institute), there are at least 16 clinical trials that showed potential benefits to health.

Certifications 
Manufacturing and quality certifications when producing E.longifolia extract is crucial to ensure quality and safety standards. Common certifications issued by E.longifolia, or Tongkat Ali manufacturers include GMP certified, Halal-certified, Kosher-certified, or producing in a FDA-inspected facility.

Another important certification is the Certificate of Analysis (COA) report, which is produced by an in-house lab or 3rd party laboratories such as EUROFINS, SGS, Intertek and others. COA provides information on the bioactive ingredients of E.longifolia, and may contain additional information such as microbial tests report and toxicity heavy metal test report and adulterant test report.

Extracts & Standardization

Non-Standardized Extract 
Products stating various E.longifolia extract ratios of 1:50, 1:100, and 1:200 are common on the market and mainly sourced from China. However extracts based on this ratio system are often non-standardized, thus delivering inconsistent set of bioactive composition or values for each batch of production. Scientific research performed on herbal products indicates that in many cases the content of bioactive constituents varies between products.

A higher extraction ratio (eg: 200:1 or 500:1) is often marketed as a stronger product, but higher extract ratio just means that more of everything else that was part of the original material was removed, and is not a measure of how much actual E.longifolia mass is present.

Non-standardized Tongkat Ali extract does not guarantee consistent potency or efficacy, with varying outcomes or gains to health.

Standardized Extract 

Another option in herbal extraction is to utilize standardization methods to monitor the bioactive content and quality of the extract against standardization markers. Among standardization markers that have been used for E.longifolia are eurycomanone, total protein, total polysaccharide and glycosaponin, which have been recommended in a technical guideline developed by the Scientific and Industrial Research Institute of Malaysia (SIRIM).

Standardization 
Tongkat Ali standards such as the Malaysian Standard MS2409 prescribes the quality requirements and specifications of freeze-dried water extract derived from dried root of Tongkat Ali (i.e Eurycoma longifolia). It is the world's first published standard on Tongkat Ali and the Malaysian standard accreditation system is in accordance with the international standard, MS ISO/IEC 17011.

The Tongkat Ali standard of MS2409 states that any Tongkat Ali standardized extract must contain eurycomanone content between 0.8% – 1.5%, polysaccharides above 30%, protein above 20% and glycosaponin above 40%.

There are two common types of standardized Tongkat Ali extract, i.e hot-water standardized extract and ethanol-based standardized extract. Hot water standardized extract has greater potency than ethanol-based extract, with higher safety limit.

Patents
An extract process and method of treatment for sexual dysfunction and male infertility was issued a U.S. patent in 2006, with subsequent international filings in the EU and Japan. Additional patent applications have been filed in the U.S. for various processes and indications, but as of August 2017 none have resulted in issued patents; the inclusion of three such patent applications follow this sentence. An attempt to patent E.longifolia led to protests due to its being a natural product with widely-known traditional uses, though the patent in question was allegedly meant only to cover a specific extraction process, rather than the plant itself. One of the patent licensees, Biotropics, an investee company under sovereign wealth fund Khazanah, clarified that the patent does not claim the plant itself nor "traditional knowledge" over the plant, but covers only "new scientific uses" relating to the plant.

Adulteration and contamination
There have been a number of cases of products falsely claiming to contain E.longifolia as an ingredient, as well as E.longifolia product contamination cases. In 2006 the U.S. Food and Drug Administration (FDA) banned seven dietary supplement products that claimed to include E.longifolia as a principal ingredient, but which additionally contained prescription drugs and even analogues of prescription drugs that have not yet been tested for safety in humans, such as acetildenafil.

In 2017, the FDA announced that two different brands of E.longifolia-containing coffee were recalled after being found to be adulterated with active ingredients from erectile dysfunction drugs.

In Malaysia, there are over 200 registered E.longifolia products from different species. However, a 2006 study on products containing Tongkat Ali Hitam (i.e Black Tongkat Ali) showed that 26% of these were contaminated with mercury between 0.5 ppm to 2.53 ppm. The heavy metal limits set by FDA on food products must contain mercury (Hg) less than 1 part per million (ppm), arsenic (As) less than 3 ppm and lead (Pb) less than 10 ppm.

Yellow Tongkat Ali (Eurycoma Longifolia) sold in the market today has relatively lower mercury levels than Black Tongkat Ali (Polyalthia bullata)  at 0.05 ppm, which is within the safety limits set by FDA and significantly lower than mercury levels found in common fresh seafood.

Conservation and sustainability
E.longifolia is mainly used for its roots, which necessitates uprooting the entire plant when it is harvested. This has led to concerns over the long-term sustainability of its use.

In Malaysia raw E.longifolia is banned from export, and the plant itself been listed as one of the priority medicinal species for conservation, and the harvesting of wild trees is restricted according to Act 686 on International Trade in Endangered Species. In 2016, Ahmad Shabery Cheek, the Malaysian Minister of Agriculture, said that the species may go extinct within twenty years if cultivation and replanting efforts are not made quickly. Despite this, the Malaysian government has encouraged the commercialization of high-value herbal products based on this plant, notably in its 2010 Economic Transformation Programme, where Tongkat Ali is listed among the top five herbs to be developed on a large scale until the year 2020. To support this commercialization, the Malaysian government made attempts to encourage the long-term commercial cultivation of the plant, through the provision of grants for farmers, enabling agronomy research by MARDI, and the formation of cluster farms under the East Coast Economic Region.

Prescription 
Tongkat Ali is classified as a dietary or food supplement and does not require prescription by medical doctors. However, it is recommended to consult your nearest doctor or GP before consuming Tongkat Ali.

Tongkat Ali has been reviewed by experts and medical professionals such as Dr. Rena Malik (urologist) from the University of Maryland Medical Center, Dr Andrea Militello  (Urologist & Andrologist) from Italy and even by neuroscientist such as Dr. Andrew Huberman  (from Stanford University, USA) amongst others.

Dosage 
Daily dosage of 200mg to 400mg of Tongkat Ali (Eurycoma Longifolia) appeared to be safe according to Healthline.com.   However, there is no sufficient evidence to suggest an optimal dosage for Tongkat Ali as the efficacy is dependent on the extract protocols and health goals. Most of the clinical studies on Tongkat were performed using daily dosage between 200mg to 400mg over a period of two to twelve weeks.

Toxicity Limit 
An acute toxicity study found that the oral Lethal Dose 50 (LD50) of an ethanol-based Tongkat Ali extract on animals is between 1500-2000 mg/kg, while the oral LD50 of a water-based Tongkat Ali extract is higher than 3000 mg/kg. It means, for an adult weighing 100kg, the upper toxicity limit of Tongkat Ali (Eurycoma Longifolia) is estimated to be 30,000 mg per day.

Chemical constituents 
Eurycoma longifolia has been reported to contain the glycoprotein compounds eurycomanol, eurycomanone, and eurycomalactone.

See also
 Labisia pumila
 Quassinoid

References

Medicinal plants of Asia
Simaroubaceae
Flora of Indo-China
Flora of Borneo
Flora of Sumatra
Dioecious plants